Johann Christian Siebenkees (20 August 1753 – 22 November 1841) was a German jurist, poet, and writer. He was a cousin of the philosopher Johann Philipp Siebenkees.

1753 births
1841 deaths
German poets
German male poets